In enzymology, an alpha-1,4-glucan-protein synthase (ADP-forming) is an enzyme that catalyzes the chemical reaction

ADP-glucose + protein  ADP + alpha-D-glucosyl-protein

Thus, the two substrates of this enzyme are ADP-glucose and protein, whereas its two products are ADP and alpha-D-glucosyl-protein.

This enzyme belongs to the family of glycosyltransferases, specifically the hexosyltransferases.  The systematic name of this enzyme class is ADP-glucose:protein 4-alpha-D-glucosyltransferase. Other names in common use include ADP-glucose:protein glucosyltransferase, and adenosine diphosphoglucose-protein glucosyltransferase.

References

 

EC 2.4.1
Enzymes of unknown structure